The Royal Households of the United Kingdom consists of royal officials and the supporting staff of the British Royal Family, as well as the Royal Household which supports the Sovereign. Each member of the Royal Family who undertakes public duties has his own separate Household.

King Edward VII (1841–1910) was created Prince of Wales shortly after his birth, and his household was known as the Household of the Prince of Wales from 1841.
Upon his marriage in 1863, he and his wife shared the Household of the Prince and Princess of Wales until their accession as King and Queen in January 1901, but several appointments were to either the Prince or the Princess (e.g.. they each had separate Lords Chamberlain and private Secretaries).
When he became King, his household was known as the Household of the Sovereign 1901–1910.

Queen Alexandra (1844–1925) received a separate household upon her husband's accession, the Household of the Queen. From 1910, it was known as the Household of Queen Alexandra.

Household of the Prince of Wales 1841–1863

Treasurer and cofferer
1856: Colonel the Honourable C. B. Phipps

Chancellor and Keeper of the Great Seal
1856: Thomas Pemberton Leigh (later Baron Kingsdown)

Privy Seal
1856: Lord Alfred Hervey

Attorney-general
1856: W. J. Alexander

Tutor
1856: F. W. Gibbs, MA

Household of the Prince and Princess of Wales 1863–1901

Keeper of the Privy Purse and Comptroller
?–1901: General Sir Dighton Probyn, VC, GCB, GCSI, GCVO

Private Secretary to the Prince of Wales
?–1901: General Sir Dighton Probyn, VC, GCB, GCSI, GCVO
1870-1901: Sir Francis Knollys, KCB, KCMG

Lords of the Bedchamber to the Prince of Wales
1866–1883: James Hamilton, 2nd Duke of Abercorn
1872–1901: Charles Harbord, 5th Baron Suffield

Grooms-in-Waiting to the Prince of Wales
1886-1901: Sir Francis Knollys, KCB, KCMG

Equerries to the Prince of Wales
1876–1899: Major-General Sir Arthur Ellis, KCVO, CSI
1899-1901: Hon. Sidney Robert Greville, CB

Extra Equerry to the Prince of Wales
1899–1901: Major-General Sir Arthur Ellis, KCVO, CSI

Lords Chamberlain to the Princess of Wales
1863–1873: George Harris, 3rd Baron Harris
1873–1901: Charles Colville, 10th Lord Colville of Culross

Private secretaries to the Princess of Wales
?-1870: Herbert W. Fisher
1870–1889: Maurice Holzmann
1889–?: Stanley de A. C. Clarke

Ladies of the Bedchamber to the Princess of Wales
1863–1873: Fanny Osborne, Marchioness of Carmarthen (Duchess of Leeds from 1871)
1863–1866: Henrietta Robinson, Countess de Grey
1863–1901: Helen Douglas, Countess of Morton
1863–1901: Mary Parker, Countess of Macclesfield
1873–1901: Cecilia Harbord, Baroness Suffield
1895–1901: Edith Bulwer-Lytton, Countess of Lytton

Women of the Bedchamber to the Princess of Wales
1863–1865: Hon. Mrs Robert Bruce (extra 1865–?)
1863–1873: Hon. Mrs William George Grey (extra 1873–?)
1863–?: Hon. Mrs Edward Coke
1863–?: Mrs. Francis Stonor
1865–?: Hon. Mrs Arthur Hardinge
1872–1901: Lady Emily Kingscote
1873–1901: (Elizabeth) Charlotte Knollys
1893–1901: Mrs. Charles Hardinge

Physician in Ordinary to the Prince of Wales
1863-1898: Sir William Jenner, Bart., GCB
1899-1901: Sir James Reid, Bart., KCB

Household of King Edward VII 1901–1910

Master of the Horse
1901–1905: William Cavendish-Bentinck, 6th Duke of Portland, KG, GCVO
1905–1907: Osbert Molyneux, 6th Earl of Sefton
1907–1910: Bernard Forbes, 8th Earl of Granard, KP, GCVO

Lord Steward
1901–1905: Sidney Herbert, 14th Earl of Pembroke, GCVO
1905–1907: Cecil Foljambe, 1st Earl of Liverpool
1907–1910: William Lygon, 7th Earl Beauchamp

Lord Chamberlain
1901–1905: Edward Villiers, 5th Earl of Clarendon
1905–1910: Viscount Althorp, GCVO (later Earl Spencer)

Vice-Chamberlain
1901–1902: Sir Alexander Acland-Hood, Bart. (later Baron St. Audries)
1902–1905: Frederick Glyn, 4th Baron Wolverton
1905–1907: Hon. Wentworth Beaumont (Baron Allendale from 1907, later Viscount Allendale)
1907–1910: Sir John Fuller, 1st Baronet

Treasurer
1901–1903: Victor Christian William Cavendish (later Duke of Devonshire)
1903–1905: James Hamilton, Marquess of Hamilton (later Duke of Abercorn)
1905–1909: Sir Edward Strachey, Bart. (later Baron Strachie)
1909–1910: William Dudley Ward

Comptroller
1901–1905: Arthur Annesley, 11th Viscount Valentia, CB, MVO
1905–1909: Alexander Murray, Master of Elibank (later Baron Murray of Elibank)
1909–1910: Arthur Foljambe, 2nd Earl of Liverpool

Lords-in-Waiting
1901–?: Charles Harbord, 5th Baron Suffield, GCVO, KCB
1901–1903: Richard Curzon, 4th Earl Howe
1901–1905: Rudolph Feilding, 9th Earl of Denbigh
1901–1905: Algernon Keith-Falconer, 9th Earl of Kintore, GCMG
1901–1905: Lloyd Tyrell-Kenyon, 4th Baron Kenyon
1901–1905: Victor Spencer, 3rd Baron Churchill, GCVO (from 1902 Viscount Churchill)
1901–1905: John Lawrence, 2nd Baron Lawrence

Master of the Household
1901–1907: Horace Farquhar, Baron Farquhar (later Earl Farquhar)
1907–1910: Lieutenant-Colonel Sir Charles Arthur Frederick, GCVO, KCB

Deputy Master of the Household
1901–1907: Lieutenant-Colonel Charles Arthur Frederick, CVO (app Master of the Household 1907)
1907–1910: Harry Lloyd-Verney, MVO

Keeper of the Privy Purse
1901–1910: General Sir Dighton Probyn, VC, GCB, GCSI, GCVO

Private Secretary
1901–1910: Sir Francis Knollys, GCB, GCVO, KCMG (from 1902 Baron Knollys, later Viscount Knollys)

Comptroller of Accounts
1901–1907: Major-General Sir Arthur Ellis, KCVO, CSI

Crown Equerry
1901–?: Sir Henry Peter Ewart, 1st Baronet, KCB, KCVO

Equerries
1901–?: Major-General Sir Stanley de A C Clarke, KCVO
1901–1902: Lieutenant-Colonel the Hon. Sir William Carington, KCVO, CB
1901–1910: Lieutenant-Colonel Sir Arthur Davidson, GCVO, KCB
1901–1910: Lieutenant-Colonel Sir Henry Charles Legge, GCVO
1901–1910: Captain the Hon. Sir Seymour Fortescue, KCVO
1901–1910: Captain Sir George Lindsay Holford
1901–?: Captain Sir Frederick Edward Grey Ponsonby, GCB, GCVO (later Baron Sysonby)
1902–1910: Honourable John Hubert Ward

Extra Equerries
1901: Lieutenant-Colonel Robert Loyd-Lindsay, 1st Baron Wantage, VC, KCB
1901–1902: Lieutenant-Colonel Sir Robert Nigel F Kingscote, GCVO, KCB
1901–1904: Major-General Sir John Carstairs McNeill, VC, GCVO, KCB, KCMG
1901–1910: General Sir Dighton Probyn, VC, GCB, GCSI, GCVO
1901–?: Major-General John Cecil Russell
1901–1910: Lieutenant-Colonel Sir Fleetwood Edwards, GCVO, KCB
1901–1910: Lieutenant-Colonel Sir Arthur Bigge, GCB, GCVO, GCIE, KCSI, KCMG (later Baron Stamfordham)
1901–1907: Major-General Sir Arthur Ellis, KCVO, CSI
1901–?: Captain the Honourable Alwyn Greville
1901–1910: Lord Marcus Talbot de la Poer Beresford
1902–1910: Lieutenant-Colonel the Hon. Sir William Carington, GCVO, KCB
1902–1910: Lieutenant-Colonel Arthur Balfour Haig, CMG, Royal Engineers
1902–1910: Vice-Admiral the Honourable Hedworth Lambton, KCB, KCVO
1902–1910: Lieutenant-Colonel Sir Charles Arthur Frederick, KCVO

Honorary Equerries
1901–1904: General Alexander Hood, 1st Viscount Bridport, GCB
1901–?: General Augustus FitzRoy, 7th Duke of Grafton, KG

Grooms-in-Waiting
1901–1907: Colonel Lord Edward William Pelham-Clinton, GCVO, KCB
1901–?: Honourable Sidney Robert Greville, CVO, CB
1901–?: Honourable Henry Julian Stonor, MVO
1901–?: Vice-Admiral Sir John Reginald Thomas Fullerton, GCVO, CB
1901–?: Sir Alexander Condie Stephen, KCMG, KCVO, CB
1901–?: General Sir Godfrey Clerk, CB
1901–?: Captain Walter Douglas Somerset Campbell, CVO

Extra Grooms-in-Waiting
1901–?: Honourable Alexander Grantham Yorke, CVO
1901–1910: Major-General Sir Thomas Dennehy, KCIE
1901–?: Sir Maurice Holzmann, KCVO, CB
1901–1904: General Sir Michael Biddulph, GCB

Master of the Ceremonies
1901–1903: Colonel the Honourable Sir William James Colville, KCVO, CB
1901–: Honourable Richard Charles Moreton
1903–1907: Sir Douglas Dawson
1907–1910: Honourable Sir Arthur Walsh

Assistant Master of the Ceremonies
1901–?: Robert Follett Synge, Esq., CMG

Gentleman Usher of the Black Rod
1901–1904: General Sir Michael Biddulph, GCB
1904–1910: Admiral Sir Henry Stephenson

Gentleman Usher to the Sword of State
1901–1910: Honourable Sir Spencer Cecil Brabazon Ponsonby-Fane, GCB

Gentleman Ushers
1901–1902: Honourable Aubrey FitzClarence (later Earl of Munster)
1901–1903: Major-General John Ramsay Slade, CB
1901–1905: Charles James Innes-Ker
1901–1906: Montague Charles Eliot (later Earl of St Germans)
1901–1908: Captain Walter James Stopford, CB
1901–1909: Major-General John Palmer Brabazon, CB, CVO
1901–1910?: Colonel Cuthbert Larking
1901–1910: Honourable Sir Spencer Cecil Brabazon Ponsonby-Fane, GCB
1901–1910: Major the Honourable Arthur Hay
1901–1910: Captain the Honourable Otway Frederick Seymour Cuffe
1901–1910: Honourable Henry Julian Stonor, MVO
1901–1910: Arthur Collins, CB, MVO
1901–1910: Sir Lionel Henry Cust
1901–1910: Sir Henry David Erskine, CVO
1901–1910: Arnold Royle, CB
1901–1910: Brook Taylor
1901–1910: Horace Charles George West
1902–1905: Honourable Arthur Henry John Walsh (replacing FitzClarence)
1903–1910: Percy Armytage (replacing Slade)
1905–1910: Sir John Ramsay Slade (replacing Innes-Ker)
1905–1907: Harry Lloyd-Verney (replacing Walsh)
1907–1910: Charles Windham (replacing Verney)
June 1908–October 1908: Charles Elphinstone Fleeming Cunninghame Graham (replacing Stopford)
1908–1910: Thomas Arthur Fitzhardinge Kingscote (replacing Graham)
1908–1910: Gerald Montagu Augustus Ellis (replacing Eliot)
1909–1910: Henry Fludyer (replacing Brabazon)

Governor and Constable of Windsor Castle
1901–1910: John Campbell, 9th Duke of Argyll, KT, GCMG, GCVO

Deputy Governor and Constable of Windsor Castle
1901–1910: Reginald Brett, 2nd Viscount Esher

Keeper of the Jewel House, Tower of London
1901–1909: General Sir Hugh Henry Gough, GCB, VC
1909–1910: Sir Robert Cunliffe Low

Secretary of the board of Green Cloth
1901–?: George Augustus Courroux, Esq. MVO

Gentleman of the Cellars
1901–1910: Thomas Kingscote, MVO

Surveyor of the King′s Pictures
1901–?: Sir Lionel Henry Cust, KCVO, FSA

Librarian at Windsor Castle
1901–?: Richard R. Holmes, CVO

Keeper of the King´s Armoury
1901–1910: Guy Francis Laking, MVO

Poet Laureate
1901–1910: Alfred Austin

Master of the King´s Music
1901–1910: Sir Walter Parratt

Marine Painter in Ordinary
1901–?: Edward de Martino, Esq, MVO

Manager of His Majesty´s Thoroughbred Stud
1901–1910: Lord Marcus Talbot de la Poer Beresford

Medical Household

Coroner of the Household
1901–?: Arthur Walter Mills, Esq.

Physicians in Ordinary
1901–1907: Sir William Henry Broadbent, Bt., KCVO, MD
1901–1910: Sir James Reid, Bt., GCVO, KCB, MD
1901–1910: Sir Francis Laking, Bt., GCVO, KCB, MD

Physicians Extraordinary
1901–?: Surgeon-General Sir Joseph Fayrer, Bt., KCSI, MD
1901–?: Sir Richard Douglas Powell, Bt., KCVO, MD
1901–1904: Sir Edward Henry Sieveking, MD
1901–1904: Sir Felix Semon, MD
1901–1902: John Lowe, MD

Serjeant Surgeons in Ordinary
1901–1902: Joseph Lister, 1st Baron Lister, OM
1902–1910: Sir Frederick Treves, 1st Baronet, GCVO, CB

Honorary Serjeant Surgeons to His Majesty
1901: Sir William MacCormac, 1st Baronet, KCB, KCVO
1901–?: Sir Thomas Smith, 1st Baronet, KCVO

Honorary Surgeon to His Majesty
1902: Inspector-General of Hospitals and Fleets Sir Henry Frederick Norbury, MD, KCB, Director-General of the Medical Department of the Navy
1902: Alfred Downing Fripp F.R.C.S., Assistant Surgeon at Guy's Hospital

Honorary Physician to His Majesty in Ireland
–1901: William Moore, Esq., MD
1901–?: Sir Francis R. Cruise, MD, University of Dublin, Fellow and Ex-President Royal College of Physicians of Ireland (replacing Moore)

Ecclesiastical Household

Lord High Almoner
1901–1906: Lord Alwyne Compton, DD, Bishop of Ely
1906–1910: Joseph Armitage Robinson, Dean of Westminster

Dean of the Chapels Royal
1901–1910: The Bishop of London

Sub-Almoner and Sub-Dean of the Chapels Royal
1901–?: Reverend Edgar Sheppard, DD

Clerk of the Closet
1901–1903: Randall Davidson, KCVO, Bishop of Winchester
1903–1910: William Boyd Carpenter, Bishop of Ripon

Deputy Clerks of the Closet
1901–1903: Very Reverend Frederic William Farrar, DD, Dean of Canterbury
1901–?: Reverend Canon John Neale Dalton, CVO, CMG, MA
1901–?: Reverend William Rowe Jolley, MA

Chaplains-in-Ordinary
See full list Ecclesiastical Household

Honorary Chaplains
See full list Ecclesiastical Household

Household of Queen Alexandra 1901–1925

Lords Chamberlain to the Queen
1901–1903: Charles Colville, 10th Lord Colville of Culross(Viscount Colville of Culross from 1902)
1903–1925: Richard Curzon, 4th Earl Howe

Vice-Chamberlains
1901–1922: Archibald Acheson, 4th Earl of Gosford

Treasurers
1901–1923: Frederick Robinson, 2nd Marquess of Ripon

Comptroller
1910–24: Sir Dighton Probyn

Lords-in-waiting
1910–?: Francis Knollys, 1st Baron Knollys

Equerries
1901–1910: John Brocklehurst (extra 1910–?)
1910–1922: Colonel Sir Arthur Davidson, GCVO, KCB
1910–?: Sir George Lindsay Holford
1910–?: John Hubert Ward
1910–?: Henry Streatfield
1923–?: Edward Seymour

Extra equerries
1910–?: Sir Charles Frederick

Private secretaries
1901–1911: Hon. Sidney Greville
1911–?: Henry Streatfield

Assistant Private Secretaries

Mistresses of the Robes
1901–1912: Louisa Montagu-Douglas-Scott, Duchess of Buccleuch
1913–1925: Winifred Cavendish-Bentinck, Duchess of Portland

Ladies of the Bedchamber
1901–?: Cecilia Harbord, Baroness Suffield
1901–1905: Edith Bulwer-Lytton, Countess of Lytton
1901–?: Louisa McDonnell, Countess of Antrim
1901–1925: Louisa Acheson, Countess of Gosford
1905–1910: Maud Petty-FitzMaurice, Marchioness of Lansdowne (extra 1910–?)
1907–1910: Cicely Gascoyne-Cecil, Marchioness of Salisbury (extra 1910–?)
1911–1925: Cecilia Wynn Carrington, Countess Carrington (Marchioness of Lincolnshire from 1912)

Extra Ladies of the Bedchamber
1901–?: Helen Douglas, Countess of Morton
1901–?: Mary Parker, Countess of Macclesfield
1910–?: Alice Stanley, Countess of Derby
1910–?: Winifred Hardinge, Baroness Hardinge of Penshurst

Women of the Bedchamber
1901–1907: Lady Emily Kingscote
1901–?: (Elizabeth) Charlotte Knollys
1901–1910: Mrs. Charles Hardinge (later Lady Hardinge)
1901–?: Lady (Victoria) Alice Stanley

Maids of Honour
1901–1905: Hon. Dorothy Vivian
1901–?: Hon. Violet Vivian
1901–1905: Hon. Mary Dyke
1901–?: Hon. Sylvia Edwardes
1905–?: Margaret Dawnay
1905–?: Blanche Lascelles
1919–?: Hon. Lucia White

Surgeon-Apothecary
1910–?: Sir Francis Laking

Surgeon
1907–?: Hugh Rigby
1910–?: Sir Frederick Treves

Physician Extraordinary
1910–?: Sir Alan Reeve Manby

Laryngologist
1910–?: Sir John Milsom Rees

Bacteriologist
1912–?: Harold Spitta

Hon. Domestic Chaplain
1910–?: Edgar Sheppard
1911–?: Frederic Percival Farrar
1911–?: Ernest Edward Holmes
1911–?: Mortimer Egerton Kennedy
1912–?: Arthur Rowland Harry Grant

See also
Royal Households of the United Kingdom
Household of George V and Mary

References

Royal households
British royal family
Edward VII
Alexandra of Denmark